Germanium monosulfide or Germanium(II) sulfide is the chemical compound with the formula GeS. It is a chalcogenide glass and a semiconductor. Germanium sulfide is described as a red-brown powder or black crystals. Germanium(II) sulfide when dry is stable in air, hydrolyzes slowly in moist air but rapidly reacts in water forming Ge(OH)2 and then GeO. It is one of a few sulfides that can be sublimed under vacuum without decomposition.

Preparation
First made by Winkler by reducing GeS2 with Ge. Other methods include reduction in a stream of H2 gas, or with an excess of H3PO2 followed by vacuum sublimation.

Structure
It has a layer structure similar to that of black phosphorus.  The Ge-S distances range from 247 to 300 pm. Molecular GeS in the gas phase has a 
Ge-S bond length of 201.21 pm.

References

Germanium(II) compounds
Sulfides